This is My Earth (TiME) is a non-profit organization dedicated to preserving biodiversity by using crowdsourcing to purchase lands in biodiversity hotspots.

TiME was established in 2015 by Prof. Uri Shanas  of the University of Haifa-Oranim. The organization is co-chaired by Shanas and Prof. Alon Tal of Tel Aviv University, and advised by an international team of scientists and environmental activists. 
TiME functions as a democracy in which every member, regardless of the amount of their donation, has an equal vote to determine which scientifically-vetted conservation project is allocated a crowdfunded grant on an annual basis. 
The organization's goal is to preserve biodiversity hotspots and to curb the Sixth extinction, which is mainly caused by human activity.

History
TiME was founded in 2015 by professors Uri Shanas and Alon Tal, both noted scientists and environmental activists. TiME capitalized on the rise in popularity of crowdfunding together with increasing internet access worldwide to found an organization in which even small donors can take an active role. TiME raised $35,515 on Indiegogo by August 13, 2015. 819 people from over 40 countries donated. This initial money was used to establish basic organizational infrastructure, register as a non-profit, expand the scientific advisory committee, set up an active Facebook page and build a website. In its first year, TiME has over one thousand affiliates.

This is My Earth successfully purchased its first parcel of land in the El Toro forest, Peru, in 2016 and transferred it to Mr. Isidoro Lozano, a community member of Yambrasbamba Campesino Community in La Esperanza, who works closely with the local Asociación Neotropical Primate Conservation Peru. The El Toro forest campaign, designed to purchase land in the Peruvian Amazon to protect the habitat of the Critically Endangered yellow-tailed woolly monkey (Oreonax flavicauda), managed to raise over $30,000.

In 2017, TiME bought land to expand the Sun Angel's Gardens reserve in Peru. The reserve's biodiversity, including the Endangered Royal Sunangel hummingbird (Heliangelus regalis) and the Endangered white-bellied spider monkey (Ateles belzebuth), was particularly vulnerable to illegal loggers, hunters and squatters because of its horseshoe shape. TiME's purchase of 700 hectares inside the U-shape of the reserve was transferred to the local indigenous community of La Primavera and the local NGO, Asociación Neotropical Primate Conservation Peru.

Funding
TiME raises funds on two different platforms for two purposes:

Crowdfunding
TiME uses crowdfunding to buy land for conservation. All funds raised through their website goes towards a land purchase and long-term conservation. Funds are allocated based on a voting system.

Grant funding
Grants are used to offset institutional maintenance costs. TiME collects grants from agencies and institutional donors, not from crowdfunding.

Procedure for land purchase
TiME allocates its funds democratically, whereby each member votes for their preferred project.

Projects
Projects, or plots of land to be purchased and protected, may be suggested to TiME by any organization worldwide. TiME's scientific advisory committee evaluates proposed projects, approves those best able to protect species and habitat, and determines the minimum necessary funds needed to realize the project. The project is then posted on TiME's website and has one calendar year (January 1 to December 30) to garner as many votes as possible. If a project does not attract enough support to receive the minimum funds from TiME (see voting), it may be resubmitted for consideration in the subsequent year by either the scientific advisory committee or the organization that initially proposed it. A project that is resubmitted must be reapproved by the scientific advisory committee. Once reapproved, the votes are reset as if it had just been submitted for the first time, unless the board of directors decides to extend the voting period.

Voting
Each member receives one vote per year. To become a member for a given calendar year a donation of at least one dollar must be made through TiME's website. Once a donation (regardless of its size) has been made, the member is given a vote to choose their preferred project. Memberships for a group of people, such as a family or school class, may be purchased through one donation, the number of votes being contingent on the size of the group and the amount donated. On December 30 votes are tallied. Each project is given a percentage of that year's income equivalent to the percentage of votes it received. A project will receive its allotment of TiME donations only if the total exceeds the minimum necessary funds determined at the outset. If a project does not obtain enough votes to reach the minimum, the project is given an additional four months to match TiME's funds with an external funding source. If the project is unable to raise the necessary funds in the given timeframe, the money it would have received from TiME rolls over into the subsequent year's total fund allocation.

Governance
TiME is led by an international team of ecologists and environmental leaders representing every continent, all working to save biodiversity through the conservation of critical habitats around the world.

Scientific advisory committee
Dr. Gerardo Ceballos

Dr. Paul R. Ehrlich

Dr. Nick Haddad

Dr. David Mutekanga

Dr. Simone Oigman-Pszczol

Dr. William (Bill) Ripple

Dr. Uri Shanas

Dr. Jian Wu

Board of directors
Ms. Francine Alfandary

Mr. David Baldock

Dr. Dror Ben-Ami

Mr. Henry Gold

Dr. Deborah Goldberg

Dr. Clive G. Jones

Ms. Josephine Kishapoi

Dr. Konstantinos C. Makris

Ms. Wanjira Mathai

Ms. Kirsten Oates

Dr. Uri Shanas

Ms. Ondine Sherman

Dr. Alon Tal

References

External links
Official site
Board of Directors
How Saving a Monkey Species Makes Us More Human

Biodiversity
Nature conservation organizations
Crowdfunding
Protected areas
Organizations established in 2015